Felin-fach is a community in Powys, Wales, northeast of Brecon. The community had a population of 673 as of the 2011 UK Census. 
It includes the villages and hamlets Llandyfaelog Tre'r-graig, Llanfilo, Tredomen, Trefeitha, Pen-isa'r-waen and Talachddu.

The church of Llanfio in the community was founded by Saint Bilo. There is also a Grade I listed church at Llandefalle.

References

External links
 Felinfach Community Council
 Llandefalle
 Tredomen Court

Communities in Powys